The discography of the English electronic group Metronomy consists of seven albums, five EPs and a number of singles. Lead vocalist and main songwriter of the band Joseph Mount also releases remixes under the name.

Studio albums

Extended plays
Wonders (2005, Wonders/Holiphonic)
You Could Easily Have Me (2006, Holiphonic)
Heartbreaker Vs. Holiday (2008, Because Music)
Not Made for Love (2009, Because Music)
Green Room (2012, Because Music)
Posse, Vol. 1 (2021)

Singles

Notes

Remixes
Air - "So Light Is Her Footfall"
Architecture in Helsinki – "Do the Whirlwind"
Box Codax – "Naked Smile"
Cassius featuring Ryan Tedder & Jaw - "The Missing" (Metronomy's EDM Mix)
Charlie Alex March – "Piano Song"
Charlotte Gainsbourg – "5:55"
CSS – "Move"
Dead Disco – "The Treatment"
Diplo - "Newsflash"
DNTEL – "The Distance"
Franz Ferdinand – "Do You Want To"
Get Cape. Wear Cape. Fly – "I-Spy"
Goldfrapp - "Happiness"
Good Shoes – "Morden"
Gorillaz – "El Mañana"
Hot Club de Paris – "Clockwork Toy"
Infadels – "Love Like Semtex"
Joakim - "Spiders"
k.d. lang - "Coming Home"
Kate Nash – "Foundations"
Klaxons – "Atlantis to Interzone"
Lady Gaga - "You and I"
Ladytron – "Sugar"
Late of the Pier - "The Bears Are Coming"
Love Is All - "Spinning and Scratching"
Lykke Li - "I'm Good, I'm Gone"
Magnet – "Hold On"
Max Sedgley – "Slowly"
Midnight Juggernauts - "Into the Galaxy"
Myd featuring Mac DeMarco - "Moving Men"
Roots Manuva – "Awfully Deep (Lambeth Blues)"
Sébastien Tellier – "La Ritournelle"
Temposhark – "Not That Big"
The Very Best - "Warm Heart Of Africa"
Ximena Sariñana - "La tina"
The Young Knives – "Weekends and Bleak Days (Hot Summer)"
Zero 7 – "Futures"

Like many contemporary artists Metronomy have utilized MySpace to promote and release music.  Joseph has in the past uploaded unreleased remixes and covers from the likes of 100 Bullets Back, Britney Spears, Bright Eyes and U2 as well as his own original material.

Production

Charlie Alex March - "In The End"
Nicola Roberts - "I" and "Fish Out Of Water" - Cinderella's Eyes
Roots Manuva – "Let The Spirit" and "C.R.U.F.F."- Slime & Reason
CocknBullKid - "Dumb" - Adulthood
Sophie Ellis-Bextor - "Make A Scene" - Make a Scene
Night Works - "Boys Born In Confident Times", "The Eveningtime" and "Long Forgotten Boy" - Urban Heat Island

Unreleased remixes and cover versions

 Bright Eyes - "Gold Mine Gutted"
 Britney Spears - "Toxic"
 The Cure - "Fascination Street"
 The Customers - "Morning Sickness"
 Empire of the Sun - "We Are the People"
 Scissor Sisters - "Other Side"
 U2 - "City of Blinding Lights"

References

External links
 

Electronic music discographies